The 24th South American U18 Championships in Athletics were held in Cuenca, Ecuador on 30 June and 1 July 2018.

Medal summary

Men

Women

Mixed

Medal table

References

South American U18 Championships in Athletics
South American U18 Championships in Athletics
South American U18 Championships in Athletics
South American U18 Championships in Athletics
International athletics competitions hosted by Ecuador
South American U18 Championships in Athletics